This is a list of Spanish television related events in 1970.

Events 
 21 March: Julio Iglesias performing the song Gwendolyne represents Spain a España en el Eurovision Song Contest 1970, that took place in Ámsterdam (Netherlands), ranking 4th, receiving 8 points.

Debuts

La 1 
 Al filo de lo imposible 
 Bajo el mismo techo  
 Diana en negro  
 Eva frente al espejo  
 Pajareando    
 Remite: Maribel
 Teatro de misterio   
 Las tentaciones 
 El último café
 Violeta en la país de la fantasía
 24 horas 
 Animalia  
 Aventuras 
 Buenas tardes
 Cinco estrellas
 El Cine
 Cine cómico
 Cine para todos
 Conviene saber  
 Con vosotros
 Crónica de un maestro
 Cuarto continente
 Danzas españolas  
 En equipo    
 Los españoles 
 Estudio loco
 Los felices 70 
 Festival  
 Hablemos de España
 Hispanovisión   
 Hoy también es fiesta
 La huelga del hombre 
 Investigación en marcha  
 Los miércoles de Pablo VI
 Mirada al mundo
 Noticias a las 3 
 Ojos nuevos   
 Pasaporte a Dublín
 Personajes a trasluz   
 Planeta azul
 Primera hora   
 Un pueblo para Europa
 Puerta grande
 Segundos fuera
 La semana que viene
 Sinfonía 2
 Sobre la marcha
 Tiempo libre
 Tiempo para creer
 Vida salvaje   
 Voces de oro

La 2 
 Páginas sueltas
 Viaje alrededor de una pareja  
 Antología
 Desde mi butaca  
 Imágenes y melodías
 Itinerarios románticos
 Estudio abierto
 Festival  
 Galería
 Grandes intérpretes
 Lo que va de siglo
 Nocturno
 Noticia 2
 Palmo a palmo  
 Recuerdos de España

Television shows

La 1 
 Telediario (1957–present)
 Novela (1962–1979)
 Antena infantil (1965–1971)
 Ayer domingo (1965–1971)
Estudio 1 (1965–1981)
 The Chiripitiflauticos (1966–1976)
 Teatro breve (1966–1981)
La casa de los Martínez (1967–1971)
Club mediodía (1967–1972)
 Por tierra, mar y aire (1968–1972) 	
 Pequeño estudio (1968–1974) 	
 Cuentos y leyendas (1968–1976)
 Fórmula Todo (1969–1972)

La 2 
 Sospecha (1963–1971)
 Telecomedia de humor (1966–1971)
 Teatro de siempre (1966–1972)
 Luces en la noche (1966–1974)
 Torneo (1967–1979)
 Hora once (1969–1974)

Ending this year

La 1 
Fin de semana (1963–1970)
Panorama de actualidad (1963–1970)
El Séneca (1964–1970)
Historias para no dormir (1965–1970)
 Misterios al descubierto (1966–1970)
 Festival de la Canción Infantil de TVE (1967–1970)
 Fábulas (1968–1970) 	
 Fauna (1968–1970) 	
 Manos al volante (1968–1970) 	
 Nivel de vida (1968–1970) 	
 Quiniela, La (1968–1970) 	
 Tele-club (1968–1970) 	
 Cita con Tony Leblanc (1969–1970) 	
 Las Diez de últimas ( 1969–1970) 	
 Especial pop (1969–1970) 	
 El Espectador y el lenguaje (1969–1970) 	
 Esta noche con... (1969–1970) 	
 Galas del sábado (1969–1970) 
 Los Hombres saben, los pueblos marchan (1969–1970) 	
 La Huella del hombre (1969–1970) 	
 Rimas populares (1969–1970)

La 2 
 Gama (1966–1970)

Foreign series debuts in Spain

Births

 1 January – Alicia Ramírez, actress and hostess.
31 January – Goyo Jiménez, comedian
 6 February – Armando del Río, actor.
 25 February – Beatriz Rico, actress.
 27 March – Nico Abad, host.
 11 April – Mar Regueras, actress.
 6 May – Tristán Ulloa, actor.
 18 May – Javier Cárdenas, host.
 22 May – Guillermo Toledo, actor.
 24 June –
 David Fernández, comedian.
 Goizalde Núñez, actress.
 25 July – Jorge Javier Vázquez, host.
 1 August – Luis Callejo, actor.
 12 August – Mariola Fuentes, actress.
 15 September – Yola Berrocal, showoman.
 2 October – Maribel Verdú, actress.
 2 November – Joel Joan, actor.
 3 November – Yolanda Alzola, hostess.
 22 November – Miguel Ángel Valero, actor.
 24 November – Alonso Caparrós, host.
 5 December – Nacho Guerreros, actor.
 12 December – Carmen Morales, actress.
 17 December – Quico Taronjí, host.
 Marcos López, host

Deaths
 5 January – Antonio Martelo, actor.
 17 March – Jesús Álvarez, host, 44.
 5 October – Luchy Soto, actress, 51.

See also
1970 in Spain
List of Spanish films of 1970

References 

1970 in Spanish television